Yutaka, founded as the Shinsei Manufacturing, was a Japanese company that operated in the field of video game publishing. It changed its name and joined the Bandai Group in January 1990. Yutaka joined Popy in 2003 after a merger and disappeared.

Games

Famicom
Parody World: Monster Party
Karakuri Kengoden Musashi Lord: Karakuri Jin Shissouru
Hyokkori Hyōtanjima: Nazo no Kaizokusen
Last Armageddon
Mahou no Princess Minky Momo: Remember Dream
Ushio to Tora: Shin'en no Daiyō
Nakayo Shito Issho

Super Famicom
3x3 Eyes Seimakourinden
Dear Boys
Kachō Kōsaku Shima: Super Business Adventure
Logos Panic
Shin Seikoku: La Wares
Supapoon
Ultra League: Moero! Soccer Daikessen!!

Game Boy
Karakuri Kengoden Musashi Lord
TV Champion
Kingyo Chūihō! Wapiko no Waku Waku Stamp Rally!

References
List of Yutaka games at GameFAQs

Bandai
Former Bandai Namco Holdings subsidiaries
Video game companies of Japan
Video game publishers